Marcus Howard (born October 10, 1985) is an American former professional football player who was a defensive end in the National Football League (NFL) and Canadian Football League (CFL). He was drafted by the Indianapolis Colts in the fifth round of the 2008 NFL Draft. He played college football for the Georgia Bulldogs.

Howard has also been a member of the Tennessee Titans.

Early years
Howard played high school football at Hanahan High School in Hanahan, South Carolina. While there he played running back and linebacker and was a three-time all-region and two-time class 2-A all-state choice. As a senior, he was the class 2-A Defensive Player of the Year. He also played basketball and ran track.

College career
Howard played college football at Georgia. He played both defensive end and linebacker. During his senior year, he started all 13 games and achieved First-team All-SEC honors after recording 41 tackles, 10.5 sacks, and three forced fumbles. He finished his career with 79 tackles, 12 sacks, and four forced fumbles. He won the 2008 Sugar Bowl MVP after he posted 3.5 sacks, one forced fumble which he recovered in the end zone for a touchdown, and a deflected pass which was intercepted by teammate Dannell Ellerbe.

Professional career

Indianapolis Colts
Howard was drafted by the Indianapolis Colts in the fifth round of the 2008 NFL Draft. He was waived on September 5, 2009.

Tennessee Titans
Howard signed a future contract with the Tennessee Titans on January 13, 2010. He was waived on August 12. He was later re-signed, only to be released again on July 28, 2011.

Edmonton Eskimos
On August 1, 2011, Howard signed a contract with the Edmonton Eskimos of the CFL

References

External links
Edmonton Eskimos player bio 
Indianapolis Colts bio
http://www.georgiadogs.com/ViewArticle.dbml?SPSID=40675&SPID=3571&DB_OEM_ID=8800&ATCLID=308242&Q_SEASON=2007
https://web.archive.org/web/20111123104626/http://esks.com/article/esks-add-to-d-line

1985 births
Living people
People from Berkeley County, South Carolina
Players of American football from South Carolina
American football defensive ends
American football linebackers
Indianapolis Colts players
Tennessee Titans players
Players of Canadian football from South Carolina
Canadian football defensive linemen
Edmonton Elks players